The Kokomo Tribune is a daily newspaper based in Kokomo, Indiana, United States. It is owned by Community Newspaper Holdings Inc.

The Tribune was cited by the Audit Bureau of Circulation for the nation's highest market penetration for eight years in the 1970s; honored with the state's Century Business Award in 1994; and, more recently, a 2006 Suburban Newspaper Association award for "best online initiative," a nod to kokomotribune.com's video, audio and audio slide shows.

The paper's marketing slogan is "Positively, Part of Your Life."

History 
The Tribune can trace its history back to October 1850, when the weekly Howard Tribune was founded in Kokomo to cover Howard County, Indiana. T.C. Philips (owner, 1856–1878) was credited with raising the paper's quality and rebuilding it after an 1862 tornado. Between 1897 and 1981, the paper was among the state's most influential under ownership by the Kautz-Blacklidge family until, at the direction of the partners/owners, then publisher Kent Blacklidge sold it to Thomson Corporation. In 2000, Thomson sold the Tribune to CNHI, which owns several other Indiana newspapers.

In 1989, The Kokomo Perspective began publishing in Kokomo as a weekly competitor to the Tribune.  The Kokomo Perspective ceased publication in late 2021.

References

External links
 Kokomo Tribune Website
 CNHI Website

Newspapers published in Indiana
Howard County, Indiana
1850 establishments in Indiana